The following is a list of episode titles from the sitcom Reba, broadcast by The WB and later The CW and aired from October 5, 2001, to February 18, 2007. A total of 127 episodes aired. Reba McEntire starred as the title character, Reba Hart.

Series overview

Episodes

Season 1 (2001–02)

Season 2 (2002–03)

Season 3 (2003–04)

Season 4 (2004–05)

Season 5 (2005–06)

Season 6 (2006–07)

References

Lists of American sitcom episodes